Palestine College of Nursing is a Palestinian university college which is administratively and financially affiliated to the Palestinian Ministry of Health. Its academic program is supervised by the Palestinian Ministry of High Education. It was first founded in 1976 under the name "The school of nurses" which was changed in 1994 to its current name after the establishment of the Palestinian National Authority.

References

1976 establishments in the Israeli Military Governorate
Nursing schools in Palestine
Educational institutions established in 1976
Universities and colleges in Gaza Strip